Shyamali Gupta (1 June 1945 − 25 November 2013) was a politician and Central Committee member of the Communist Party of India (Marxist). She was former general secretary of its women's wing, the All India Democratic Women's Association (AIDWA).

References

Women in West Bengal politics
Communist Party of India (Marxist) politicians from West Bengal
1945 births
2013 deaths
20th-century Indian women politicians
20th-century Indian politicians
21st-century Indian women politicians
21st-century Indian politicians